Micaela Retegui (born 23 April 1996) is an Argentine field hockey player. She is the daughter of Argentina's hockey coach Carlos Retegui. She plays with the Argentina national field hockey team, winning silver medal at the 2020 Summer Olympics.

Hockey career 
In 2019, Retegui was called into the senior national women's team. She competed in the team that finished fourth at the 2019 Pro League in Amstelveen.

She won a bronze medal at the 2014 Youth Olympics in Nanjing. She won a gold medal at the 2019 Pan American Games.

References

Living people
1996 births
Argentine female field hockey players
Field hockey players at the 2014 Summer Youth Olympics
Pan American Games medalists in field hockey
Pan American Games gold medalists for Argentina
Field hockey players at the 2019 Pan American Games
Medalists at the 2019 Pan American Games
Field hockey players at the 2020 Summer Olympics
Olympic field hockey players of Argentina
Olympic silver medalists for Argentina
Medalists at the 2020 Summer Olympics
Olympic medalists in field hockey
21st-century Argentine women